Kiwi Black is a fictional mutant character appearing in American comic books published by Marvel Comics. His first appearance was in The Uncanny X-Men #429.

Fictional character biography
Little is known about the past of Kiwi Black, apart from the fact his mother Rēhua is from Ruatoki, New Zealand, and that his father, Azazel seduced her. Because of this, Kiwi Black is the half-brother of Nightcrawler and Abyss.

The name Kiwi Black is in reference to his mother's homeland of New Zealand and the country's indigenous bird, the kiwi. It is also common for New Zealanders to refer to themselves as  "Kiwis."The "black" is in reference to the names of New Zealand sports teams, the most popular being the All Blacks Rugby team. Others include the Tall Blacks (basketball), Black Sticks (hockey) and the Black Caps (cricket).

He was a mutant bred by Azazel to help him transport his army to Earth from the hellish dimension they had been trapped in. However, after he survived a summoning ritual (one of three to survive) meant to free Azazel's army, he started secretly operating within Azazel's castle to free the X-Men. Kiwi rejected his father’s influence, and allied himself with the X-Men in order to eliminate Azazel’s army. In the process, he killed one of Azazel's thugs and gained respect from Nightcrawler.

Decimation/M-Day
After M-Day, it was revealed that Kiwi Black was among the many mutants depowered, as listed by S.H.I.E.L.D., alongside his half-brother Abyss.

Powers and abilities
Kiwi Black can focus bio-energy through his body to increase the potency of his physical attacks as well as his already impressive strength from his natural physical build. His energy-empowered attacks are so powerful because of his ability to release energy at the point of contact, which enhances his strength to the point where he can break through boulders with his bare hands or create a gigantic crater by simply kicking the ground. His creator Chuck Austen has described these attacks as "being hit with a sledgehammer shot out of a cannon at 220 MPH".

By using this method of energy transference as well as others he has developed, Kiwi Black is able to use his energy to affect the surrounding area or another person. He can touch someone and use intricate combinations of his energy and theirs to cause internal malfunctions in the person, such as heart failure or even scrambled superpowers.  By slamming his fist into the ground, he can direct energy through it to make a pillar of rock/spikes rise up.

References

Fictional half-demons
Fictional Māori people
Fictional murderers
Fictional New Zealand people
Marvel Comics characters with superhuman strength
Marvel Comics mutants
Marvel Comics superheroes